Taj Mahotsav (Hindi: ताज महोत्सव, Urdu: تاج مہوتسو, translation: Taj Festival) is an annual 10-day (from 18 to 27 February) event at Shilpgram in Agra, India. This festival is inspired by the old Mughal era and nawabi style prevalent in Uttar Pradesh in the 18th and 19th centuries.

Arts and crafts 
About 400 artisans from different parts of India display their works of art. These include wood/stone carvings from Tamil Nadu, bamboo/cane work from North East India, paper mash work from South India and Kashmir, marble and zardozi work from Agra, wood carving from Saharanpur, brass wares from Moradabad, hand made carpets from Bhadohi, pottery from Khurja, Chikan work from Lucknow, silk and zari work from Banaras, shawls and carpets from Kashmir/Gujarat, hand printing from Farrukhabad and Kantha stitch from West Bengal.Various film production & media house of Bollywood like Dhaivat Records & Productions also participates and manages artists in Mahotsav.

Culture 
The festival starts with a road procession with decorated elephants and camels like the victory processions of Mughal emperors and warlords. Drum beaters, trumpet players, folk dancers, skilled craftsmen and artisans also join the procession. Artists from all over India come here to display their art and craftmanship.

Initiatives 
The Uttar Pradesh State AIDS Control Society understands the importance of the event and uses different folk dances to campaign about AIDS awareness.

Theme 
Every year the Taj Mahotsav is celebrated with a message or theme for the world. In 2017 the theme for Taj Mahotsav is "विरासत की छाँव में" ("In the shadow of Heritage"). Through this theme, the whole heritage of the zone which provides a backdrop to the festival is stressed.

Entry and tickets 
 Entry ticket is for Rs. 40/- (children under age 10 are free).
 All foreign visitors have free entry.

See also 
 Agra
 Ram Barat
 Taj Mahal

References

 tajmahotsav.org
 agra.nic.in/TajMahotsav.htm
  upaidscontrol.up.nic.in/Events/Mahotsav.mht

Festivals in Uttar Pradesh
Tourist attractions in Agra